Longbranch is an unincorporated community and census-designated places in Pierce County, Washington, United States.  It is located on the Key Peninsula, along Filucy Bay between Pitt Passage and Balch Passage.  Longbranch is primarily residential (like nearby Home and Lakebay) and includes a marina, church, and community centre.

The community was named after Long Branch, New Jersey.

History
In 1934, Longbranch was linked by ferry service with Steilacoom, Anderson and McNeil islands.  The ferry continues in operation, but no longer connects to Longbranch.

References

External links

Census-designated places in Pierce County, Washington
Census-designated places in Washington (state)
Unincorporated communities in Pierce County, Washington
Unincorporated communities in Washington (state)